Urechești is a commune located in Vrancea County, Romania. It is composed of a single village, Urechești. It also included Popești and Terchești villages until 2003, when they were split off to form Popești Commune.

Natives
 Valeriu Pantazi (1940–2015), poet, writer, and painter

References

Communes in Vrancea County
Localities in Muntenia